= 8/7 =

8/7 may refer to:

- August 7 (month-day date notation)
- July 8 (day-month date notation)
